Hoklingen is a lake in the municipality of Levanger in Trøndelag county, Norway.

The lake Movatnet is the main inflow of water into Hoklingen.  There is a small dam that regulates the outflow of water at the southwest end of the lake.  The water flows out into the river Fossingelva which then flows into the nearby lake Hammervatnet.

See also
List of lakes in Norway

References

Levanger
Lakes of Trøndelag
Reservoirs in Norway